Passiflora membranacea is a species of Passiflora from Costa Rica, Guatemala, and El Salvador.

References

External links
 
 

membranacea
Flora of Guatemala